Jelenac   is a village in the municipality of Topola, Serbia. At the 2002 census, the village had a population of 375.

References

Populated places in Šumadija District